82 Mechanised Brigade was a Formation of 8th South African Armoured Division, a combined arms force consisting of infantry, armour and artillery.

History

Establishment
82 Mech was established on 1 August 1974 as part of 8th South African Armoured Division, an armoured formation.
By 1977, the Brigade comprised:
Two Mechanised Infantry Battalions: Regiment de la Rey and Regiment Groot Karoo
A Tank Regiment: Regiment President Steyn
A Armoured Car Regiment: Regiment Mooirivier
A Field Artillery Regiment: Regiment Potchefstroom University
A Field Engineer Squadron: 13 Field Engineer
A Signals Units: 82 Signals
A Maintenance Unit: 3 Maintenance Unit
A Field Workshop: 71 Field Workshop and
A Field Ambulance:

Divisional Transfer
In 1985, 82 Mechanised Brigade was transferred to 7 Division.

South West Africa and Angola

Operations
As part of 7 Division, 82 Mech was primarily involved in:
 Operation Packer
During Operation Packer which succeeded Operation Hooper in March 1988, 82 Mechanised Brigade protected the eastern bank of the Cuito River. During this operation the FAPLA forces suffered losses and the situation on the eastern bank stabilised to such an extent that Operation Displace could start. During this phase the South African forces withdrew from Angola.

Disbandment
8th South African Armoured Division’s Brigades were disbanded in 1992 and the battalions and regiments came to answer directly to the divisional headquarters - the thinking was that these would be grouped into task forces as required.

Insignia

Roll of Honour
 Fincham, D.R. 1982
 Coleby, D.N. Sgt 1983

Honoris Crux Recipients
 Lewis, M.J. WO, 12 Sept 1990
 Du Plessis, R. S Sgt, 12 Sept 1990

Leadership

Further developments
82 Mech Brigade can be considered the Citizens Force version of 61 Mech, encompassing similar battlegroup or Task Force principles.

See also

References

External links

Brigades of South Africa
Military units and formations established in 1974
Military units and formations of South Africa in the Border War
Military units and formations disestablished in 1992